Lu River may refer to:

 Lu River, an alternate name for Jinsha River, the upper stretches of the Yangtze River
 Lushui River (He River), a tributary of He River which is a tributary of Gan River
 Lushui River or Lu River, a tributary of Xiang River, Hunan Province